Andrei Bugneac (born 30 March 1988) is a Moldovan footballer who currently plays for FC Dinamo-Auto Tiraspol as a striker.

International career
Bugneac played his first international game with the senior national team on 7 June 2014 in and against Cameroon (1–0), after he came on as a substitute for Alexandru Antoniuc in the 53rd minute of that game.

References

External links
 
 

1988 births
Living people
Moldovan footballers
Moldova international footballers
FC Zimbru Chișinău players
FC Veris Chișinău players
Association football forwards